Cornus foemina is a species of flowering plant in the Cornaceae known by the common names stiff dogwood and swamp dogwood. It is native to parts of the eastern and southeastern United States.

This plant is a large shrub or small tree up to 15 feet tall with trunks up to 4 inches wide. The bark is smooth or furrowed. The oppositely arranged, deciduous leaves are oval in shape with smooth edges. The inflorescence is a flat-topped cluster of white flowers. The fruit is a blue or purple drupe.

This plant grows in wetlands, often in swampy conditions. It can tolerate moderate amounts of salinity.

References

External links

USDA Plants Profile
Vanderbilt Bioimages

foemina
Flora of the Southeastern United States
Flora of the Appalachian Mountains
Flora of the Northeastern United States
Flora of the North-Central United States
Flora of the South-Central United States
Taxa named by Philip Miller